Guinean coup d'état may refer to:

 1984 Guinean coup d'état
 2008 Guinean coup d'état
 2021 Guinean coup d'état